Buildings, sites, districts, and objects in California listed on the National Register of Historic Places:

There are more than 2,800 properties and districts listed on the National Register of Historic Places in the 58 counties of California, including 145 designated as National Historic Landmarks.


Numbers of properties and districts by county

The following are approximate tallies of current listings in California on the National Register of Historic Places. These counts are based on entries in the National Register Information Database as of April 24, 2008, and new weekly listings posted since then on the National Register of Historic Places web site. There are frequent additions to the listings and occasional delistings and the counts here are not official. Also, the counts in this table exclude boundary increase and decrease listings which modify the area covered by an existing property or district and which carry a separate National Register reference number.

See also
List of bridges on the National Register of Historic Places in California
List of National Historic Landmarks in California
List of California Historical Landmarks

References

External links

State of California Office of Historic Preservation

National Register of Historic Places travel itineraries:
World War II in the San Francisco Bay Area
Early History of the California Coast
Santa Clara County: California's Historic Silicon Valley
Aviation: From Sand Dunes to Sonic Booms

 01
 01

California